Rehema Stephens (born December 28, 1969) is a former professional basketball player for the Sacramento Monarchs.

She played basketball at Oakland Technical High School, making all-league in 1985, 1987, and 1988. In 1986-87 she was named first team All-State and third team Parade All American. In college, she played one season for the University of Colorado and three seasons for the University of California, Los Angeles. At UCLA she led the Pac-10 Conference in scoring in her first and second seasons; in her second season she was the fifth-highest scorer in the country. She reached 1,000 points faster than any other Lady Bruin and is still the school's second-highest career scorer in women's basketball.

She graduated from UCLA with a degree in psychology, then turned pro. She played basketball in Australia and Greece before joining the Monarchs. Retiring from basketball after one season, she has since worked as a teacher, Realtor, radio host and author.

References

1969 births
Living people
American women's basketball players
Basketball players from Oakland, California
Guards (basketball)
Los Angeles Sparks draft picks
Parade High School All-Americans (girls' basketball)
Sacramento Monarchs players
UCLA Bruins women's basketball players